Elections were held in the Australian state of Queensland on 19 September 1992 to elect the 89 members of the state's Legislative Assembly.

The Labor Party led by Wayne Goss was reelected for a second term with a strong majority government. The election effectively confirmed the status quo, although the ALP lost a small percentage of votes and four seats. Three of those were new seats which were nominally Labor following the redistribution.

This was the first election in many decades in which a zonal system of electoral representation did not exist. The previous parliament had legislated for a "one vote one value" electoral redistribution, in which almost all the 89 electoral districts were to have similar numbers of electors (within a 10% margin of the mean). The only exceptions were electorates that had areas of at least 100,000 square kilometres. The number of electors in each of those electorates was increased by 2% of the total area of the electorate expressed in square kilometres, to ensure that the number of electors in the affected electorates was within 10% of the mean enrolment. This election also saw the introduction of optional preferential voting (replacing compulsory full-preferential voting) in Queensland elections, which would remain in place until the 2016 electoral reforms of the Palaszczuk government.

Although Labor suffered a small swing against it in north Queensland, that was slightly masked by the abolition of the zonal system.

Key dates

Results

|}

Seats changing hands 

 Most seats that changed hands were newly created by the extensive electoral redistribution before the election.
 Members listed in italics did not recontest their seats.
 ** The 1991 redistribution combined the fairly safe Labor held electorate of Mourilyan with marginal National held electorate of Hinchinbrook. Based on 1989 results, Hinchinbrook has a notional seat margin of 3.0%.

Post-election pendulum

See also
 Members of the Queensland Legislative Assembly, 1989–1992
 Members of the Queensland Legislative Assembly, 1992–1995
 Candidates of the Queensland state election, 1992
 Goss Ministry

References

Elections in Queensland
1992 elections in Australia
1990s in Queensland